Free sale, fixity of tenure, and fair rent, also known as the Three Fs, were a set of demands first issued by the Tenant Right League in their campaign for land reform  in Ireland from the 1850s. They were,

 Free sale—meaning a tenant could sell the interest in his holding to an incoming tenant without landlord interference;
 Fixity of tenure—meaning that a tenant could not be evicted if he had paid the rent;
 Fair rent—meaning rent control: for the first time in the United Kingdom, fair rent would be decided by land courts, and not by the landlords.

Many historians argue that their absence contributed severely to the Great Irish Famine (1846–49), as it allowed the mass eviction of starving tenants. The Three Fs were campaigned for by a number of political movements, notably the Independent Irish Party (1852–1858) and later the Irish Parliamentary Party during the Land War (from 1878). They were conceded by the British Government in a series of Irish Land Acts enacted from the 1870s on, with essentially full implementation in the Land Law (Ireland) Act 1881.

References

History of Ireland (1801–1923)
Land reform in Ireland
Landlord–tenant law
Rent regulation
Regulation in Ireland